Caohai Lake (Sea of Grass in Chinese) is a natural water-body situated in Northwest Guizhou Province of southwest China.  The lake is situated on Weining Mountain, in the outskirts of Weining County. Caohai Village lies directly at the edge of the wetland.

Physical data 
The lake originally covered . However, as a result of drainage, cultivation, and climate change during the last few decades, the lake area has contracted to only .

Caohai Nature Reserve
In 1985, the area around the lake was designated as a nature reserve at the provincial level, and in 1992 this was elevated to a national level designation. Cao Hai Nature Reserve is an Important Bird Area.

Fauna
The lake area is the largest and most important wetland of Southwest China, providing wintering grounds for black-necked cranes, the only crane species inhabiting plateaus left in the world.  In addition, the lake is also inhabited by 184 bird species, including common cranes, hooded cranes, white storks, black storks, bar-headed geese, golden eagles, eastern imperial eagles, white-tailed sea-eagles, and ruddy shelducks.

One frog species, Rana weiningensis, is endemic to this area.

References

Lakes of China
Lakes of Guizhou
Nature reserves in China